Project Gotham Racing 3 is a racing video game developed by Bizarre Creations and published by Microsoft Game Studios. It was released exclusively for the Xbox 360 as a launch title in November 2005. The game was rated by Official Xbox Magazine as Xbox 360 "Game of the Year" (2005), as well as "Best 1st Person (Not Shooter) of the Year", because of its realistic inside-car view. A sequel, Project Gotham Racing 4, was released in October 2007.

Gameplay
Project Gotham Racing 3 offers players four cities—Las Vegas, London, New York City, and Tokyo—as well as the Nürburgring to race through. Project Gotham Racing 3 features 80 licensed cars from over 30 manufacturers such as Ferrari, Dodge, and Lamborghini.

The polygons used to make up a car model increases in Project Gotham Racing 3, to between 80,000 and 100,000. The increased polygon count allows for smoother, less jagged-shaped cars than in earlier games. Of the 80 cars in the game, 71 are unlocked and available for play at the start of a new game, while the remaining 9 (prototypes, one-offs, and concept) cars are left for the player to unlock.

Sound quality is improved from the previous game, with Bizarre dedicating a sound team to record and implement car audio in the game using the Xbox 360's new audio capabilities.

In a change from the previous two games, Project Gotham Racing 3 emphasizes supercars and special models instead of generic production cars (cars with a top speed of over 170 mph). One of the starter cars is the Acura NSX. Similar to its predecessors, each car in Project Gotham Racing 3 is allocated to a specific class. There are five classes, A through E, the high performance cars being Class A, and the low performance cars in Class E.

Kudos once again play an important part in Project Gotham. Kudos points are given for stylish driving, for example drifting around a corner, drafting, or getting two or four wheels off the ground. When combos are linked up, the player is given a bonus for keeping them linked together, and this builds up to huge amounts if the combo is held for a substantial length of time. This bonus is, however, lost if the player crashes into any barriers, though the base Kudos (all but the combo bonus) are kept.

Multiplayer
Project Gotham Racing 3 allows multiplayer offline with up to two players on one Xbox 360 console or more players via System Link. Project Gotham Racing 3 offers online integrated scoreboards for single player career events as well as Time Trials and test track times. Gamers with Xbox Live Gold are able to race with up to seven other competitors in races online. Online career (ranked) and playtime (unranked) are both offered as online multiplayer modes. Scoreboards also track standings for online career.

Reception

Project Gotham Racing 3 received "generally favorable" reviews according to video game review aggregator Metacritic.

USA Today gave it a score of nine-and-a-half stars out of ten and said it "offers plenty of "oohs" and "aahs" with impressive graphics and sound. But luckily this game still plays very well too. And with a robust online package and plenty of racing options, it becomes a 360 must-have." The Sydney Morning Herald gave it four stars out of five and said that "despite Gotham'''s obliging nature, high-speed thrills and gorgeous graphical sheen, it's hard not to feel that we have seen its best tricks before." However, Detroit Free Press gave it a score of three stars out of four and stated that "online play is as hectic, though perhaps not as friendly, as the previous Xbox version."Project Gotham Racing 3'' received a "Platinum" sales award from the Entertainment and Leisure Software Publishers Association (ELSPA), indicating sales of at least 300,000 copies in the United Kingdom.

DLC content
In 2006, several DLCs were released:
The entire Cadillac V-Series was made available in May as free download content.
A speed pack was made available in April, with tournament access, new features, some fixes, and new cars.
A style pack was made available in July, featuring more cars and features.

References

External links
 

2005 video games
Esports games
Microsoft games
Multiplayer and single-player video games
Multiplayer online games
Project Gotham Racing
Racing video games set in the United States
Video games developed in the United Kingdom
Video games scored by Tom Salta
Video games set in Tokyo
Video games set in the United Kingdom
Video games with custom soundtrack support
Video games with downloadable content
Xbox 360 games
Xbox 360-only games
Bizarre Creations games